Nigel Edward Buxton (29 May 1924 – 30 November 2015) was a British travel writer and wine critic, also known for appearing as  in the Channel 4 comedy series The Adam and Joe Show.

Early life

Buxton was born at Cowfold, Sussex, where his father, Gordon Offord Buxton, worked as a 'general factotum' at Brook Hill House, owned by Lt-Col Edward William ('Robert') Hermon of the 1st King Edward's Horse, to whom the elder Buxton had been a servant since 1908, accompanying him as his batman during World War I.

Career

Travel writer

After education at Collyer's Grammar School, Horsham and the Imperial Service College, Windsor, followed by the University of Glasgow and Worcester College, Oxford, at the latter of which he read Modern History, graduating in 1954, Buxton became travel columnist - later travel editor - of The Sunday Telegraph in 1961.

BaaadDad

In the 1990s, Buxton appeared as "BaaadDad" on The Adam and Joe Show on Channel 4, which was written and presented by his son Adam Buxton along with Adam's friend Joe Cornish. The comedy behind the character of BaaadDad was the juxtaposition of the fact that he was clearly an elderly and upper middle class man with the topics that he discusses, which relate to youth culture - clubbing, drug use, and so on. In this character, he featured in the video for Frank Black's single "Dog Gone".

Personal life and death

During the Second World War, having been commissioned in the Royal Artillery in 1943, Buxton served in France and Germany. Prior to his journalistic career, Buxton also served as assistant adjutant in India during the last days of the British Raj. With his wife, Valerie (née Birrell), Buxton had a daughter and two sons.

Buxton wrote several books, including A Penguin Guide to Travel in Europe, published by Penguin in 1965, Travel '67, published by Follett in 1967, and Walking in Wine Country, published by Weidenfeld & Nicolson in 1993.

Buxton died from complications arising from lung cancer at his son Adam Buxton's Norfolk home on 30 November 2015.

References

1924 births
2015 deaths
British travel writers
Royal Artillery officers
Writers from London
People from Cowfold
British Army personnel of World War II